|}

This is a list of electoral district results for the 1999 Victorian state election.

Results by electoral district

Albert Park

Altona

Ballarat East

Ballarat West

Bayswater

Bellarine

Benalla

Benambra

Bendigo East

Bendigo West

Bennettswood

Bentleigh

Berwick

Box Hill

Brighton

Broadmeadows

Bulleen

Bundoora

Burwood

Carrum

Caulfield

Clayton

Coburg

Cranbourne

Dandenong

Dandenong North

Doncaster

Dromana

Eltham

Essendon

Evelyn

Footscray

Forest Hill

Frankston

Frankston East

Geelong

Geelong North

Gippsland East

Gippsland South

Gippsland West

Gisborne

Glen Waverley

Hawthorn

Ivanhoe

Keilor

Kew

Knox

Malvern

Melbourne

Melton

Mildura

Mill Park

Mitcham

Monbulk

Mooroolbark

Mordialloc

Mornington

Morwell

Murray Valley

Narracan

Niddrie

Northcote

Oakleigh

Pakenham

Pascoe Vale

Polwarth

Portland

Prahran

Preston

Richmond

Ripon

Rodney

Sandringham

Seymour

Shepparton

South Barwon

Springvale

Sunshine

Swan Hill

Thomastown

Tullamarine

Wantirna

Warrandyte

Warrnambool

Werribee

Williamstown

Wimmera

Yan Yean

See also 

 1999 Victorian state election
 Candidates of the 1999 Victorian state election
 Members of the Victorian Legislative Assembly, 1999–2002

References 

Results of Victorian state elections
1990s in Victoria (Australia)